Diana Teixeira (born 12 April 1981) is a Portuguese gymnast. She competed at the 1996 Summer Olympics.

References

External links
 

1981 births
Living people
Portuguese female artistic gymnasts
Olympic gymnasts of Portugal
Gymnasts at the 1996 Summer Olympics
Sportspeople from Porto